Kuto is a surname of Kenyan origin. Notable people with the surname include:

Julius Kuto (born 1984), Kenyan marathon runner
Thomas Johnson Kuto Kalume (died 1975), Kenyan politician and clergyman

Surnames of Kenyan origin